George Coventry, 3rd Baron Coventry (1628 – 15 December 1680) was an English nobleman, the eldest son of Thomas Coventry, 2nd Baron Coventry and Mary Craven.

On 18 July 1653, he married Lady Margaret Tufton, daughter of John Tufton, 2nd Earl of Thanet, by whom he had two children:
John Coventry, 4th Baron Coventry (1654–1687)
Margaret Coventry (14 June 1657 – 7 February 1682), married Charles Paulet, 2nd Duke of Bolton

References
Coventry genealogy

1628 births
1680 deaths
3